Götzen, a community of Schotten in Hesse, Germany, may refer to:
Gustav Adolf von Götzen (1866–1910), German explorer and governor
Johann von Götzen (1599–1645), Imperial Generalfeldmarschall during the Thirty Years' War
Sigismund von Götzen (1576–1650), chancellor of the Margraviate of Brandenburg
Lubbertus Götzen (1894–1979), Dutch accountant and politician
Götzen-Dämmerung (The Twilight of the Idols), a book by Friedrich Nietzsche
MV Liemba, a ship formerly known as Graf von Götzen